Windsor University School of Medicine is a private offshore medical school located in Cayon, Saint Mary Cayon Parish, Saint Kitts and Nevis in the Caribbean. Windsor confers upon its graduates the Doctor of Medicine (MD) degree. The university also has clinical education campuses in Carbondale, Illinois and Houghton Lake, Michigan. Administrative offices are located in Monee, Illinois.

History 

Windsor was founded in December 1998 on Grand Turk Island in Turks and Caicos by Dr. Srinivas Gaddam. Instruction began with a class of eight students. In 2000, the university relocated to Bird Rock, a town in the Saint George Basseterre Parish in Saint Kitts, with twelve students.

In 2004, Windsor acquired the Royal Plaza Inn in Carbondale, Illinois as a site for 5th semester training and announced plans to relocate the Bird Rock campus to the town of Cayon in the Saint Mary Cayon Parish. Windsor began construction on the new Cayon campus in 2006. Windsor acquired the Atrium Plaza hotel in Houghton Lake, Michigan and the Sidney Inn in Sidney, Ohio for use as additional 5th semester training sites in 2009 and 2010, respectively.

The most recent addition, the Robert Llewellyn Bradshaw building, was completed in September 2010, at which time the enrollment was approximately 1,100 students. Also in September 2010, Windsor announced plans for further expansion with new laboratories and a 1500-seat auditorium. The university enrollment was approximately 1,500 students as of October 2011.

Curriculum 

The MD program at Windsor is a 10 semester course of study that consists of three semesters per calendar year. Semesters 1-4 are basic sciences semesters that are completed at the university's Saint Kitts campus. Semester 5 (Introduction to Clinical Medicine) is completed either at the Saint Kitts campus or at one of the university's three clinical education campuses in the United States. Semesters 6-10 consist of 72 weeks of clinical clerkships that are completed at either Joseph Nathaniel France General Hospital in Saint Kitts or hospitals in the United States.

Windsor also offers a 3 semester pre-medical program for high school graduates who have not completed the necessary prerequisites for the MD program.

Accreditation and recognition 
Windsor University School of Medicine is chartered in Saint Kitts and accredited by the Accreditation Board of Saint Kitts and Nevis, a recognized accrediting agency listed in the FAIMER Directory of Organizations that Recognize/Accredit Medical Schools (DORA). The university is listed in the World Directory of Medical Schools and accredited with the CAAM-HP in 2023.

Student life 
Several student organizations exist at Windsor. These include, but are not limited to:
 American Medical Student Association (AMSA)
 Student Government
 Students for Health, a volunteer community service organization.
 Eye On You Foundation, formed to "cater for and improve the quality of life for the elderly."
 Muslim Students Association
Christian Students Association

See also 

International medical graduate
List of medical schools in the Caribbean
Medicine
Medical School
International medical graduate

References 

https://www.windsor.edu/academics/pre-medical-sciences/Caribbean Pre Medical University | Windsor University School of Medicine
Accredited Caribbean Medical School | Windsor University School of Medicine
Apply to Caribbean Medical School | Windsor University School of Medicine

External links 

 
 Joseph Nathaniel France General Hospital

Medical schools in Saint Kitts and Nevis
Saint Kitts (island)
For-profit universities and colleges in North America
Educational institutions established in 1998
1998 establishments in the Turks and Caicos Islands